

General Sir Richard Vernon Tredinnick Ford,  (18 February 1878 – 12 April 1949) was a Royal Marines officer who served as Adjutant-General Royal Marines.

Military career
Born on 18 February 1878, Ford was commissioned into the Royal Marine Artillery in 1896 and promoted to captain in 1903. During the First World War he commanded the Royal Navy Siege Guns at Dunkirk, as Second-in-Command of the Royal Marine Heavy Brigade, and then served as Deputy Assistant Adjutant-General at Headquarters, Royal Marine Forces. For these services he was made a Commander of the Order of the British Empire.

In January 1928 Ford, by then a colonel, was made a companion of the Order of the Bath, and was an aide-de-camp to the King from 1929 to 1930. Appointed Adjutant-General Royal Marines in June 1930, then the highest appointment within the Royal Marines, he was elevated to Knight Commander of the Order of the Bath in January 1933. He retired in October 1933 with the rank of General.

Personal life
Ford was twice married. In 1903, he married Diana Pollard, daughter of Rear-Admiral George Northmore Arthur Pollard. After her death in 1911, he was married in 1913 to Mildred Powell Underwood, daughter of Capt. Powell Cecil Underwood, with whom he had two sons and a daughter.

He died in Folkestone on 12 April 1949, aged 71.

References

External links
Photograph of Sir Richard Ford held by the National Portrait Gallery, London

1878 births
1949 deaths
Commanders of the Order of the British Empire
Knights Commander of the Order of the Bath
Royal Marines generals
Military personnel from Portsmouth
Royal Marines personnel of World War I